The Patriarchal Cross of Romania (Romanian: Crucea Patriarhală) is the highest Romanian Orthodox ecclesiastical decoration, established in 1925 by Patriarch Miron Cristea.

Recipients 
Ilie Ilașcu (1994)
Andrei Ivanțoc (1994)
Tudor Petrov-Popa (1994)
Alexandru Leșco (1994)
Petru Godiac (1994)
Dumitru Oprea (2005)
Constantin Bălăceanu-Stolnici
Traian Băsescu (2007)
Radu Ciuceanu (2017)
Simona Halep (2019)

References

Romanian decorations
Awards established in 1925
Eastern Orthodox ecclesiastical decorations